Allison Gap is an unincorporated community and census-designated place in Smyth County, Virginia. 

It was defined as a census-designated place (then termed an unincorporated place) at the 1950 United States Census where it had a population of 1,015. It did not reappear at subsequent censuses until 2020 when it was relisted as a CDP with a population of 610.

Climate
Climate in this area has mild differences between highs and lows, and there is adequate rainfall year-round.  The Köppen Climate Classification subtype for this climate is "Cfb". (Marine West Coast Climate/Oceanic climate).

References

Unincorporated communities in Smyth County, Virginia
Unincorporated communities in Virginia
Former census-designated places in Virginia